Um Sereyroth ( born 25 September 1993) is a Cambodian footballer who plays for Tiffy Army in the Cambodian Premier League and also Cambodia national football team. His older brother Um Vichet is also a footballer who also plays as a goalkeeper.

International career
Sereyroth was a member of Cambodia's squad at the 2015 Southeast Asian Games football tournament, playing as goalkeeper in all four games. He also played in all three 2016 AFC U-23 Championship qualification matches.

Sereyroth has also played at the senior level in the 2018 World Cup qualification, where he started in both first-round games against Macau as well as a second round 1-0 home defeat to Afghanistan. In 2015, he saved two penalties kicks from Khairul Amri of Singapore in Singapore and from Shinji Okazaki of Japan in Phnom Penh in 2018 FIFA World Cup qualification – AFC Second Round.

Honours

Club
National Defense Ministry
Hun Sen Cup: 2016

Individual
Cambodian League Golden Gloves: 2016
Hun Sen Cup Golden Gloves: 2016

References

1993 births
Living people
Cambodian footballers
Cambodia international footballers
Association football goalkeepers
Competitors at the 2017 Southeast Asian Games
Southeast Asian Games competitors for Cambodia